Entomolepididae is a family of crustaceans belonging to the order Siphonostomatoida.

Genera:
 Entomolepis Brady, 1899
 Entomopsyllus McKinnon, 1988
 Lepeopsyllus Thompson & Scott, 1903
 Paralepeopsyllus Ummerkutty, 1960
 Parmulella Stock, 1992
 Parmulodes Wilson, 1944
 Spongiopsyllus Johnsson, 2000

References

Siphonostomatoida